Maine is the easternmost state in the New England region of the Northeastern United States. It borders New Hampshire to the west, the Gulf of Maine to the southeast, and the Canadian provinces of New Brunswick and Quebec to the northeast and northwest, respectively. The largest state by total area in New England, Maine is the 12th-smallest by area, the 9th-least populous, the 13th-least densely populated, and the most rural of the 50 U.S. states. It is also the northeasternmost among the contiguous United States, the northernmost state east of the Great Lakes, the only state whose name consists of a single syllable, and the only state to border exactly one other U.S. state. Approximately half the area of Maine lies on each side of the 45th parallel north in latitude. The most populous city in Maine is Portland, while its capital is Augusta.

Maine has traditionally been known for its jagged, rocky Atlantic Ocean and bayshore coastlines; smoothly contoured mountains; heavily forested interior; picturesque waterways; and its wild lowbush blueberries and seafood cuisine, especially lobster and clams. Coastal and Down East Maine have emerged as important centers for the creative economy, especially in the vicinity of Portland, which is also bringing gentrification.

The territory of Maine has been inhabited by aboriginal populations for thousands of years after the glaciers retreated during the last ice age. At the time of European arrival, several Algonquian-speaking nations governed the area and these nations are now known as the Wabanaki Confederacy. The first European settlement in the area was by the French in 1604 on Saint Croix Island, founded by Pierre Dugua, Sieur de Mons. The first English settlement was the short-lived Popham Colony, established by the Plymouth Company in 1607. A number of English settlements were established along the coast of Maine in the 1620s, although the rugged climate and conflict with the local Indigenous people caused many to fail.

As Maine entered the 18th century, only a half dozen European settlements had survived. Loyalist and Patriot forces contended for Maine's territory during the American Revolution. During the War of 1812, the largely undefended eastern region of Maine was occupied by British forces with the goal of annexing it to Canada via the Colony of New Ireland, but returned to the United States following failed British offensives on the northern border, mid-Atlantic and south which produced a peace treaty that restored the pre-war boundaries. Maine was part of the Commonwealth of Massachusetts until 1820 when it voted to secede from Massachusetts to become a separate state. On March 15, 1820, under the Missouri Compromise, it was admitted to the Union as the 23rd state.

History

The earliest known inhabitants of the territory that is now Maine were Algonquian-speaking Wabanaki peoples, including the Passamaquoddy, Maliseet, Penobscot, Androscoggin, and Kennebec. During the later King Philip's War, many of these peoples would merge in one form or another to become the Wabanaki Confederacy, aiding the Wampanoag of Massachusetts and the Mahican of New York. Afterwards, many of these people were driven from their natural territories, but most of Maine's tribes continued, unchanged, until the American Revolution. Before this point, however, most of these people were considered separate nations. Many had adapted to living in permanent, Iroquois-inspired settlements, while those along the coast tended to move from summer villages to winter villages on a yearly cycle. They would usually winter inland and head to the coasts by summer.

European contact with what is now called Maine may have started around 1200 CE when Norwegians are believed to have interacted with the native Penobscot in present-day Hancock County, most likely through trade. If confirmed, this would make Maine the site of the earliest European discovery in the entire US. About 200 years earlier, from the settlements in Iceland and Greenland, Norwegians first identified America and attempted to settle areas such as Newfoundland, but failed to establish a permanent settlement. Archeological evidence suggests that Norwegians in Greenland returned to North America for several centuries after the initial discovery to trade and collect timber, with the most relevant evidence being the Maine Penny, an 11th-century Norwegian coin found at a Native American dig site in 1954.

The first European confirmed settlement in modern-day Maine was in 1604 on Saint Croix Island, led by French explorer Pierre Dugua, Sieur de Mons. His party included Samuel de Champlain, noted as an explorer. The French named the entire area Acadia, including the portion that later became the state of Maine. The Plymouth Company established the first English settlement in Maine at the Popham Colony in 1607, the same year as the settlement at Jamestown, Virginia. The Popham colonists returned to Britain after 14 months.

The French established two Jesuit missions: one on Penobscot Bay in 1609, and the other on Mount Desert Island in 1613. The same year, Claude de La Tour established Castine. In 1625, Charles de Saint-Étienne de la Tour erected Fort Pentagouet to protect Castine. The coastal areas of eastern Maine first became the Province of Maine in a 1622 land patent. The part of western Maine north of the Kennebec River was more sparsely settled and was known in the 17th century as the Territory of Sagadahock. A second settlement was attempted in 1623 by English explorer and naval Captain Christopher Levett at a place called York, where he had been granted  by King Charles I of England. It also failed.

The 1622 patent of the Province of Maine was split at the Piscataqua River into the Province of New Hampshire to the south and New Somersetshire to the north. A disputed 1630 patent split off the area around present-day Saco as Lygonia. Justifying its actions with a 1652 geographic survey that showed an overlapping patent, the Massachusetts Bay Colony had seized New Somersetshire and Lygonia by force by 1658. The Territory of Sagadahock between the Kennebec River and St. Croix River notionally became Cornwall County, Province of New York under a 1664 grant from Charles II of England to his brother James, at the time the Duke of York. Some of this land was claimed by New France as part of Acadia. All of the English settlements in the Massachusetts Bay Colony and the Province of New York became part of the Dominion of New England in 1686. All of present-day Maine was unified as York County, Massachusetts under a 1691 royal patent for the Province of Massachusetts Bay.

Central Maine was formerly inhabited by the Androscoggin tribe of the Abenaki nation, also known as Arosaguntacook. They were driven out of the area in 1690 during King William's War. They were relocated to St. Francis, Canada, which was destroyed by Rogers' Rangers in 1759, and is now Odanak. The other Abenaki tribes suffered several severe defeats, particularly during Dummer's War, with the capture of Norridgewock in 1724 and the defeat of the Pequawket in 1725, which significantly reduced their numbers. They finally withdrew to Canada, where they were settled at Bécancour and Sillery, and later at St. Francis, along with other refugee tribes from the south.

Maine was much fought over by the French, English, and allied natives during the 17th and 18th centuries. These natives conducted raids against settlers and each other, taking captives for ransom or, in some cases, kidnapped for adoption by Native American tribes. A notable example was the early 1692 Abenaki raid on York, where about 100 English settlers were killed and another estimated 80 taken hostage. The Abenaki took captives taken during raids of Massachusetts in Queen Anne's War of the early 1700s to Kahnewake, a Catholic Mohawk village near Montreal, where some were adopted and others ransomed.

After the British defeated the French in Acadia in the 1740s, the territory from the Penobscot River east fell under the nominal authority of the Province of Nova Scotia, and together with present-day New Brunswick formed the Nova Scotia county of Sunbury, with its court of general sessions at Campobello. American and British forces contended for Maine's territory during the American Revolution and the War of 1812, with the British occupying eastern Maine in both conflicts via the Colony of New Ireland. The territory of Maine was confirmed as part of Massachusetts when the United States was formed following the Treaty of Paris ending the revolution, although the final border with British North America was not established until the Webster–Ashburton Treaty of 1842.

Maine was physically separate from the rest of Massachusetts. Long-standing disagreements over land speculation and settlements led to Maine residents and their allies in Massachusetts proper forcing an 1807 vote in the Massachusetts Assembly on permitting Maine to secede; the vote failed. Secessionist sentiment in Maine was stoked during the War of 1812 when Massachusetts pro-British merchants opposed the war and refused to defend Maine from British invaders. In 1819, Massachusetts agreed to permit secession, sanctioned by voters of the rapidly growing region the following year.

Statehood and Missouri Compromise

Formal secession from Massachusetts and admission of Maine as the 23rd state occurred on March 15, 1820, as part of the Missouri Compromise, which geographically limited the spread of slavery and enabled the admission to statehood of Missouri the following year, keeping a balance between slave and free states.

Maine's original state capital was Portland, Maine's largest city, until it was moved to the more central Augusta in 1832. The principal office of the Maine Supreme Judicial Court remains in Portland.

The 20th Maine Volunteer Infantry Regiment, under the command of Colonel Joshua Lawrence Chamberlain, prevented the Union Army from being flanked at Little Round Top by the Confederate Army during the Battle of Gettysburg.

Four U.S. Navy ships have been named USS Maine, most famously the armored cruiser , whose sinking by an explosion on February 15, 1898 precipitated the Spanish–American War.

Geography

To the south and east is the Gulf of Maine, and to the west is the state of New Hampshire. The Canadian province of New Brunswick is to the north and northeast, and the province of Quebec is to the northwest. Maine is the northernmost state in New England and the largest, accounting for almost half of the region's entire land area. Maine is the only state to border exactly one other American state (New Hampshire).

Maine is the easternmost state in the United States both in its extreme points and in its geographic center. The town of Lubec is the easternmost organized settlement in the United States. Its Quoddy Head Lighthouse is also the closest place in the United States to Africa and Europe. Estcourt Station is Maine's northernmost point, as well as the northernmost point in New England. (For more information see extreme points of the United States.)

Maine's Moosehead Lake is the largest lake wholly in New England, since Lake Champlain is located between Vermont, New York, and Quebec. A number of other Maine lakes, such as South Twin Lake, are described by Thoreau in The Maine Woods (1864). Mount Katahdin is the northern terminus of the Appalachian Trail, which extends southerly to Springer Mountain, Georgia, and the southern terminus of the new International Appalachian Trail which, when complete, will run to Belle Isle, Newfoundland and Labrador.

Machias Seal Island and North Rock, off the state's Downeast coast, are claimed by both Canada and the American town of Cutler, and are within one of four areas between the two countries whose sovereignty is still in dispute, but it is the only one of the disputed areas containing land. Also in this easternmost area in the Bay of Fundy is the Old Sow, the largest tidal whirlpool in the Western Hemisphere.

Maine is the least densely populated U.S. state east of the Mississippi River. It is called the Pine Tree State; over 80% of its total land is forested or unclaimed, the most forest cover of any U.S. state. In the wooded areas of the interior lies much uninhabited land, some of which does not have formal political organization into local units (a rarity in New England).

Maine is in the temperate broadleaf and mixed forests biome. The land near the southern and central Atlantic coast is covered by the mixed oaks of the Northeastern coastal forests. The remainder of the state, including the North Woods, is covered by the New England–Acadian forests.

West Quoddy Head in Lubec is the easternmost point of land in the 48 contiguous states. Along the famous rock-bound coast of Maine are lighthouses, beaches, fishing villages, and thousands of offshore islands, including the Isles of Shoals which straddle the New Hampshire border. There are jagged rocks and cliffs and many bays and inlets. Inland are lakes, rivers, forests, and mountains. This visual contrast of forested slopes sweeping down to the sea has been summed up by American poet Edna St. Vincent Millay of Rockland and Camden, in "Renascence":

Geologists describe this type of landscape as a "drowned coast", where a rising sea level has invaded former land features, creating bays out of valleys and islands out of mountain tops. A rise in land elevation due to the melting of heavy glacier ice caused a slight rebounding effect of underlying rock; this land rise, however, was not enough to eliminate all the effect of the rising sea level and its invasion of former land features.

Much of Maine's geomorphology was created by extended glacial activity at the end of the last ice age. Prominent glacial features include Somes Sound and Bubble Rock, both part of Acadia National Park on Mount Desert Island. The extreme depth and steep drop-off allow large ships to navigate almost the entire length of the sound. These features also have made it attractive for boat builders, such as the prestigious Hinckley Yachts.

Bubble Rock, a glacial erratic, is a large boulder perched on the edge of Bubble Mountain in Acadia National Park. The Iapetus Suture runs through the north and west of the state, being underlain by the ancient Laurentian terrane, and the south and east underlain by the Avalonian terrane.

Acadia National Park is the only national park in New England. Areas under the protection and management of the National Park Service include:
 Acadia National Park near Bar Harbor
 Appalachian National Scenic Trail
 Maine Acadian Culture in St. John Valley
 Roosevelt Campobello International Park on Campobello Island in New Brunswick, Canada, operated by both the U.S. and Canada, just across the Franklin Delano Roosevelt Bridge from Lubec
 Saint Croix Island International Historic Site at Calais
 Katahdin Woods and Waters National Monument

Lands under the control of the state of Maine include:
 Maine State Parks
 Maine Wildlife Management Areas (WMA)

Climate

Maine has a humid continental climate (Köppen climate classification Dfb), with warm and sometimes humid summers, and long, cold and very snowy winters. Winters are especially severe in the Northern and Western parts of Maine, while coastal areas are moderated slightly by the Atlantic Ocean, resulting in marginally milder winters and cooler summers than inland regions. Daytime highs are generally in the  range throughout the state in July, with overnight lows in the high 50s°F (around 15°C). January temperatures range from highs near  on the southern coast to overnight lows averaging below  in the far north.

Precipitation in Maine is evenly distributed year-round, but with a slight summer maximum in northern/northwestern Maine and a slight late-fall or early-winter maximum along the coast due to "nor'easters" or intense cold-season rain and snowstorms. In coastal Maine, the late spring and summer months are usually driest—a rarity across the Eastern United States. Maine has fewer days of thunderstorms than any other state east of the Rockies, with most of the state averaging fewer than twenty days of thunderstorms a year. Tornadoes are rare in Maine, with the state averaging two per year, although this number is increasing. Most severe thunderstorms and tornadoes occur in the Southwestern Interior portion of the state, where summer temperatures are often the warmest and the atmosphere is thus more unstable compared to northern and coastal areas. Maine rarely sees the direct landfall of tropical cyclones, as they tend to recurve out to sea or are rapidly weakening by the time they reach the cooler waters of Maine.

Demographics

Population

The U.S. Census Bureau estimates that the population of Maine was 1,344,212 on July 1, 2019, a 1.19% increase since the 2010 United States census. At the 2020 census, 1,362,359 people lived in the state. The state's population density is 41.3 people per square mile, making it the least densely populated state east of the Mississippi River. As of 2010, Maine was also the most rural state in the Union, with only 38.7% of the state's population living within urban areas. As explained in detail under "Geography", there are large tracts of uninhabited land in some remote parts of the interior of the state, particularly in the North Maine Woods.

The mean population center of Maine is located in Kennebec County, just east of Augusta. The Greater Portland metropolitan area is the most densely populated with nearly 40% of Maine's population. This area spans three counties and includes many farms and wooded areas; the 2016 population of Portland proper was 66,937.

Maine has experienced a very slow rate of population growth since the 1990 census; its rate of growth (0.57%) since the 2010 census ranks 45th of the 50 states. The modest population growth in the state has been concentrated in the southern coastal counties; with more diverse populations slowly moving into these areas of the state. However, the northern, more rural areas of the state have experienced a slight decline in population from 2010 to 2016.

As of 2020, Maine has the highest population age 65 or older in the United States.

According to the 2010 census, Maine has the highest percentage of non-Hispanic whites of any state, at 94.4% of the total population. In 2011, 89.0% of all births in the state were to non-Hispanic white parents. Maine also has the second-highest residential senior population.

According to HUD's 2022 Annual Homeless Assessment Report, there were an estimated 4,411 homeless people in Maine. 

The table below shows the racial composition of Maine's population as of 2016.

According to the 2016 American Community Survey, 1.5% of Maine's population were of Hispanic or Latino origin (of any race): Mexican (0.4%), Puerto Rican (0.4%), Cuban (0.1%), and other Hispanic or Latino origin (0.6%). The six largest ancestry groups were: English (20.7%), Irish (17.3%), French (15.7%), German (8.1%), American (7.8%) and French Canadian (7.7%).

People citing that they are American are of overwhelmingly English descent, but have ancestry that has been in the region for so long (often since the 17th century) that they choose to identify simply as Americans.

Maine has the highest percentage of French Americans of any state. Most of them are of Canadian origin, but in some cases have been living there since prior to the American Revolutionary War. There are particularly high concentrations in the northern part of Maine in Aroostook County, which is part of a cultural region known as Acadia that goes over the border into New Brunswick. Along with the Acadian population in the north, many French-Canadians came from Quebec as immigrants between 1840 and 1930.

The upper Saint John River valley area was once part of the so-called Republic of Madawaska, before the frontier was decided in the Webster-Ashburton Treaty of 1842. Over a quarter of the population of Lewiston, Waterville, and Biddeford are Franco-American. Most of the residents of the Mid Coast and Down East sections are chiefly of British heritage. Smaller numbers of various other groups, including Irish, Italian and Polish, have settled throughout the state since the late 19th and early 20th century immigration waves.

Birth data
Note: Births in table do not sum to 100% because Hispanics are counted both by their ethnicity and by their race.

 Since 2016, data for births of White Hispanic origin are not collected, but included in one Hispanic group; persons of Hispanic origin may be of any race.

Language

Maine does not have an official language, but the most widely spoken language in the state is English. The 2000 census reported 92.25% of Maine residents aged five and older spoke only English at home. French-speakers are the state's chief linguistic minority; census figures show that Maine has the highest percentage of people speaking French at home of any state: 5.28% of Maine households are French-speaking, compared with 4.68% in Louisiana, which is the second highest state. Although rarely spoken, Spanish is the third-most-common language in Maine, after English and French.

Religion

According to the Pew Research Center, the religious affiliations of Maine were: Protestant 37% (in particular: Evangelical Protestant 14%, Mainline Protestant 21%, Historical Black Protestant 2%), Atheism or Agnosticism 6%, Nothing in Particular 26%, Roman Catholic Church 21%, other Christians 5%, non-Christian religions including Hinduism, Islam, Buddhism and Baháʼí 7%, and Pagans and Unitarians 5%.

The Roman Catholic Church was the largest religious institution and the Baptists (7% Evangelical and 5% Mainline) are the largest Protestant institution, followed by the Methodists (6%) and the Congregationalists (5%). The atheists and the agnostics are only 6% of the state, but 26% of Mainers said that they "Believe in God but they are Unaffiliated." The 81% of Mainers believe in God, while 3% don't know and 16% do not believe in God. The 34% of Mainers think that Religion is Very Important and 29% said that is Important, while 21% said that religion isn't important.

By the publication of another study in 2020 through the Public Religion Research Institute, approximately 62% of the population were Christian; the religiously unaffiliated slightly increased to 33% from the separate 2014 study by the Pew Research Center.

Economy

Total employment 2020
 520,969
Total employer establishments 2020
 41,646

The Bureau of Economic Analysis estimates that Maine's total gross state product for 2021 was $77.96 billion. Its per capita personal income for 2021 was $58,484, 30th in the nation. , Maine's unemployment rate is 3.3%

Maine's agricultural outputs include poultry, eggs, dairy products, cattle, wild blueberries, apples, maple syrup, and maple sugar. Aroostook County is known for its potato crops. Commercial fishing, once a mainstay of the state's economy, maintains a presence, particularly lobstering and groundfishing. While lobster is the main seafood focus for Maine, the harvest of both oysters and seaweed are on the rise. In 2015, 14% of the Northeast's total oyster supply came from Maine. In 2017, the production of Maine's seaweed industry was estimated at $20 million per year. The shrimp industry of Maine is on a government-mandated hold. With an ever-decreasing Northern shrimp population, Maine fishermen are no longer allowed to catch and sell shrimp. The hold began in 2014 and is expected to continue until 2021. Western Maine aquifers and springs are a major source of bottled water.

Maine's industrial outputs consist chiefly of paper, lumber and wood products, electronic equipment, leather products, food products, textiles, and bio-technology. Naval shipbuilding and construction remain key as well, with Bath Iron Works in Bath and Portsmouth Naval Shipyard in Kittery.

Brunswick Landing, formerly Naval Air Station Brunswick, is also in Maine. Formerly a large support base for the U.S. Navy, the BRAC campaign initiated the Naval Air Station's closing, despite a government-funded effort to upgrade its facilities. The former base has since been changed into a civilian business park, as well as a new satellite campus for Southern Maine Community College.

Maine is the number one U.S. producer of low-bush blueberries (Vaccinium angustifolium). Preliminary data from the USDA for 2012 also indicate Maine was the largest blueberry producer of the major blueberry producing states, with 91,100,000 lbs. This data includes both low (wild), and high-bush (cultivated) blueberries: Vaccinium corymbosum. The largest toothpick manufacturing plant in the United States used to be located in Strong, Maine. The Strong Wood Products plant produced 20 million toothpicks a day. It closed in May 2003.

Tourism and outdoor recreation play a major and increasingly important role in Maine's economy. The state is a popular destination for sport hunting (particularly deer, moose and bear), sport fishing, snowmobiling, skiing, boating, camping and hiking, among other activities. Concomitantly with the tourist and recreation-oriented economy, Maine has developed a burgeoning creative economy, most notably centered in the Greater Portland vicinity.

Historically, Maine ports played a key role in national transportation. Beginning around 1880, Portland's rail link and ice-free port made it Canada's principal winter port, until the aggressive development of Halifax, Nova Scotia, in the mid-20th century. In 2013, 12,039,600 short tons passed into and out of Portland by sea, which places it 45th of U.S. water ports. Portland International Jetport has been expanded, providing the state with increased air traffic from carriers such as JetBlue and Southwest Airlines.

Maine has very few large companies that maintain headquarters in the state, and that number has fallen due to consolidations and mergers, particularly in the pulp and paper industry. Some of the larger companies that do maintain headquarters in Maine include Covetrus in Portland, Fairchild Semiconductor in South Portland, IDEXX Laboratories in Westbrook, Hannaford Bros. Co. in Scarborough, and L.L.Bean in Freeport. Maine is also the home of the Jackson Laboratory, the world's largest non-profit mammalian genetic research facility and the world's largest supplier of genetically purebred mice.

Taxation

Maine has an income tax structure containing two brackets, 6.5 and 7.95 percent of personal income. Before July 2013 Maine had four brackets: 2, 4.5, 7, and 8.5 percent. Maine's general sales tax rate is 5.5 percent. The state also levies charges of nine percent on lodging and prepared food and ten percent on short-term auto rentals. Commercial sellers of blueberries, a Maine staple, must keep records of their transactions and pay the state 1.5 cents per pound ($1.50 per 100 pounds) of the fruit sold each season. All real and tangible personal property located in the state of Maine is taxable unless specifically exempted by statute. The administration of property taxes is handled by the local assessor in incorporated cities and towns, while property taxes in the unorganized territories are handled by the State Tax Assessor.

Shipbuilding

Maine has a long-standing tradition of being home to many shipbuilding companies. In the 18th and 19th centuries, Maine was home to many shipyards that produced wooden sailing ships. The main function of these ships was to transport either cargos or passengers overseas. One of these yards was located in Pennellville Historic District in what is now Brunswick, Maine. This yard, owned by the Pennell family, was typical of the many family-owned shipbuilding companies of the time period. Other such examples of shipbuilding families were the Skolfields and the Morses. During the 18th and 19th centuries, wooden shipbuilding of this sort made up a sizable portion of the economy.

Transport

Airports

Maine receives passenger jet service at its two largest airports, the Portland International Jetport in Portland, and the Bangor International Airport in Bangor. Both are served daily by many major airlines to destinations such as New York, Atlanta, and Orlando. Essential Air Service also subsidizes service to a number of smaller airports in Maine, bringing small turboprop aircraft to regional airports such as the Augusta State Airport, Hancock County-Bar Harbor Airport, Knox County Regional Airport, and the Northern Maine Regional Airport at Presque Isle. These airports are served by regional providers such as Cape Air with Cessna 402s, and CommutAir with Embraer ERJ 145 aircraft.

Many smaller airports are scattered throughout Maine, serving only general aviation traffic. The Eastport Municipal Airport, for example, is a city-owned public-use airport with 1,200 general aviation aircraft operations each year from single-engine and ultralight aircraft.

Highways

Interstate95 (I-95) travels through Maine, as well as its easterly branch I-295 and spurs I-195, I-395 and the unsigned I-495 (the Falmouth Spur). In addition, U.S. Route1 (US1) starts in Fort Kent and travels to Florida. The eastern terminus of the eastern section of US2 starts in Houlton, near the New Brunswick, Canada border to Rouses Point, New York, at US11. US2A connects Old Town and Orono, primarily serving the University of Maine campus. US201 and US202 flow through the state. US2, Maine State Route 6 (SR6), and SR9 are often used by truckers and other motorists of the Maritime Provinces en route to other destinations in the United States or as a short cut to Central Canada.

Rail

Passenger

The Downeaster passenger train, operated by Amtrak, provides passenger service between Brunswick and Boston's North Station, with stops in Freeport, Portland, Old Orchard Beach, Saco, and Wells. The Downeaster makes five daily trips.

Freight

Freight service throughout the state is provided by a handful of regional and shortline carriers: Pan Am Railways (formerly known as Guilford Rail System), which operates the former Boston & Maine and Maine Central railroads; St. Lawrence and Atlantic Railroad; Maine Eastern Railroad; Central Maine and Quebec Railway; and New Brunswick Southern Railway.

Shipping

Cargo 
The International Marine Terminal in Portland provides shipping container transport. In 2021 an estimated 36,700 shipping containers moved through the terminal. In 2017, a total of 17,515 shipping containers were transported. The Icelandic shipping company Eimskip opened its United States headquarters in Portland in 2013. Its ships stop in Portland once a week in a route that includes Atlantic Canada and Iceland with connections to northern Europe and Asia. In 2015, the terminal moved 10,500 containers. The Maine Port Authority in 2016 began a $15.5 million expansion and improvement of the terminal. The Maine Port Authority leased the International Marine Terminal from the city of Portland in 2009.

Law and government

The Maine Constitution structures Maine's state government, composed of three co-equal branches—the executive, legislative, and judicial branches. The state of Maine also has three Constitutional Officers (the Secretary of State, the State Treasurer, and the State Attorney General) and one Statutory Officer (the State Auditor).

The legislative branch is the Maine Legislature, a bicameral body composed of the Maine House of Representatives, with 151 members, and the Maine Senate, with 35 members. The Legislature is charged with introducing and passing laws.

The executive branch is responsible for the execution of the laws created by the Legislature and is headed by the Governor of Maine (currently Janet Mills). The Governor is elected every four years; no individual may serve more than two consecutive terms in this office. The current attorney general of Maine is Aaron Frey. As with other state legislatures, the Maine Legislature can by a two-thirds majority vote from both the House and Senate override a gubernatorial veto. Maine is one of seven states that do not have a lieutenant governor.

The judicial branch is responsible for interpreting state laws. The highest court of the state is the Maine Supreme Judicial Court. The lower courts are the District Court, Superior Court and Probate Court. All judges except for probate judges serve full-time, are nominated by the Governor and confirmed by the Legislature for terms of seven years. Probate judges serve part-time and are elected by the voters of each county for four-year terms.

In a 2020 study, Maine was ranked as the 14th easiest state for citizens to vote in.

Counties

Maine is divided into political jurisdictions designated as counties.

Politics

State and local politics

|}

In state general elections, Maine voters tend to accept independent and third-party candidates more frequently than most states. Maine has had two independent governors: James B. Longley (1975–1979) and Angus King (1995–2003), who currently serves in the US Senate. Maine state politicians, Democrats and Republicans alike, are noted for having more moderate views than many in the national wings of their respective parties.

Maine is an alcoholic beverage control state.

On May 6, 2009, Maine became the fifth state to legalize same-sex marriage; however, the law was repealed by voters on November 3, 2009. On November 6, 2012, Maine, along with Maryland and Washington, became the first state to legalize same-sex marriage at the ballot box.

Federal politics

In the 1930s, Maine was one of very few states which retained Republican sentiments. In the 1936 presidential election, Franklin D. Roosevelt received the electoral votes of every state other than Maine and Vermont; these were the only two states in the nation that never voted for Roosevelt in any of his presidential campaigns, though Maine was closely fought in 1940 and 1944. In the 1960s, Maine began to lean toward the Democrats, especially in presidential elections. In 1968, Hubert Humphrey became just the second Democrat in half a century to carry Maine, perhaps because of the presence of his running mate, Maine Senator Edmund Muskie, although the state voted Republican in every presidential election in the 1970s and 1980s.

Since 1969, two of Maine's four electoral votes have been awarded based on the winner of the statewide election; the other two go to the highest vote-getter in each of the state's two congressional districts. Every other state except Nebraska gives all its electoral votes to the candidate who wins the popular vote in the state at large, without regard to performance within districts. Maine split its electoral vote for the first time in 2016, with Donald Trump's strong showing in the more rural central and northern Maine allowing him to capture one of the state's four votes in the Electoral College.

Ross Perot achieved a great deal of success in Maine in the presidential elections of 1992 and 1996. In 1992, as an independent candidate, Perot came in second to Democrat Bill Clinton, despite the long-time presence of the Bush family summer home in Kennebunkport. In 1996, as the nominee of the Reform Party, Perot did better in Maine than in any other state.

Maine has voted for Democratic Bill Clinton twice, Al Gore in 2000, John Kerry in 2004, and Barack Obama in 2008 and 2012. In 2016, Republican Donald Trump won one of Maine's electoral votes with Democratic opponent Hillary Clinton winning the other three. Although Democrats have mostly carried the state in presidential elections in recent years, Republicans have largely maintained their control of the state's U.S. Senate seats, with Edmund Muskie, William Hathaway and George J. Mitchell being the only Maine Democrats serving in the U.S. Senate in the past fifty years.

In the 2010 midterm elections, Republicans made major gains in Maine. They captured the governor's office as well as majorities in both chambers of the state legislature for the first time since the early 1970s. However, in the 2012 elections Democrats managed to recapture both houses of Maine Legislature.

Maine's U.S. senators are Republican Susan Collins and Independent Angus King. The governor is Democrat Janet Mills. The state's two members of the United States House of Representatives are Democrats Chellie Pingree and 
Jared Golden.

Maine is the first state to have introduced ranked-choice voting in federal elections.

Municipalities

Organized municipalities

An organized municipality has a form of elected local government which administers and provides local services, keeps records, collects licensing fees, and can pass locally binding ordinances, among other responsibilities of self-government. The governmental format of most organized towns and plantations is the town meeting, while the format of most cities is the council-manager form.  the organized municipalities of Maine consist of 23 cities, 430 towns, and 30 plantations. Collectively these 483 organized municipalities cover less than half of the state's territory. Maine also has three Reservations: Indian Island, Indian Township Reservation, and Pleasant Point Indian Reservation.
 The largest municipality in Maine, by population, is the city of Portland (pop. 66,318).
 The smallest city by population is Eastport (pop. 1,331).
 The largest town by population is Brunswick (pop. 20,278).
 The smallest town by population is Frye Island, a resort town which reported zero year-round population in the 2000 Census; one plantation, Glenwood Plantation, also reported a permanent population of zero.
 In the 2000 census, the smallest town aside from Frye Island was Centerville with a population of 26, but since that census, Centerville voted to disincorporate and therefore is no longer a town. The next smallest town with a population listed in that census is Beddington (pop. 50 at the 2010 census).

Unorganized territory

Unorganized territory (UT) has no local government. Administration, services, licensing, and ordinances are handled by the state government as well as by respective county governments who have townships within each county's bounds. The unorganized territory of Maine consists of more than 400 townships (in Maine, towns are incorporated, townships are unincorporated), plus many coastal islands that do not lie within any municipal bounds. The UT land area is slightly over half the entire area of the State of Maine. Year-round residents in the UT number approximately 9,000 (about 1.3% of the state's total population), with many more people staying there only seasonally. Only four of Maine's sixteen counties (Androscoggin, Cumberland, Waldo and York) are entirely incorporated, although a few others are nearly so, and most of the unincorporated area is in the vast and sparsely populated Great North Woods of Maine.

Most populous cities and towns

The most populous cities and towns as of the Census Bureau's 2017 estimates were (population in parentheses):

 Portland (66,882)
 Lewiston (36,221)
 Bangor (31,903)
 South Portland (25,483)
 Auburn (23,033)
 Biddeford (21,488)
 Sanford (21,028)
 Brunswick (20,278)
 Saco (19,485)
 Scarborough (18,919)
 Westbrook (18,730)
 Augusta (18,594)

Throughout Maine, many municipalities, although each separate governmental entities, nevertheless form portions of a much larger population base. There are many such population clusters throughout Maine, but some examples from the municipalities appearing in the above listing are:
 Portland, South Portland, Cape Elizabeth, Westbrook, Scarborough, and Falmouth
 Lewiston and Auburn
 Bangor, Orono, Brewer, Old Town, and Hampden
 Biddeford, Saco and Old Orchard Beach
 Brunswick and Topsham
 Waterville, Winslow, Fairfield, and Oakland
 Presque Isle and Caribou

Education

There are thirty institutions of higher learning in Maine. These institutions include the University of Maine, which is the oldest, largest and only research university in the state. UMaine was founded in 1865 and is the state's only land grant and sea grant college. The University of Maine is located in the town of Orono and is the flagship of Maine. There are also branch campuses in Augusta, Farmington, Fort Kent, Machias, and Presque Isle.
Bowdoin College is a liberal arts college founded in 1794 in Brunswick, making it the oldest institution of higher learning in the state. Colby College in Waterville was founded in 1813 making it the second oldest college in Maine. Bates College in Lewiston was founded in 1855 making it the third oldest institution in the state and the oldest coeducational college in New England. The three colleges collectively form the Colby-Bates-Bowdoin Consortium and are ranked among the best colleges in the United States; often placing in the top 10% of all liberal arts colleges.

Maine's per-student public expenditure for elementary and secondary schools was 21st in the nation in 2012, at $12,344.

The collegiate system of Maine also includes numerous baccalaureate colleges such as: the Maine Maritime Academy (MMA), College of the Atlantic, Unity College, and Thomas College. There is only one medical school in the state, (University of New England's College of Osteopathic Medicine) and only one law school (The University of Maine School of Law). There is one art school in the state, Maine College of Art, along with a private graduate school, Institute for Doctoral Studies in the Visual Arts, which offers a Doctor of Philosophy to visual artists.

The Maine Community College System, founded in 1985 also serves "to provide associate degree, diploma and certificate programs directed at the educational, career and technical needs of the State's citizens and the workforce needs of the State's employers." This system includes Southern Maine Community College (SMCC), York County Community College (YCCC), Central Maine Community College (CMCC), Eastern Maine Community College (EMCC), Kennebec Valley Community College (KVCC), Northern Maine Community College (NMCC), and Washington County Community College (WCCC).

Private schools in Maine are funded independently of the state and its furthered domains. Private schools are less common than public schools. A large number of private elementary schools with under 20 students exist, but most private high schools in Maine can be described as "semi-private".

Maine also has Vocational Schools, such as the Biddeford Regional Center of Technology and Sanford Regional Technical Center that teach trades such as welding, construction and vehicle repair to students.

Culture

Agriculture

Maine was a center of agriculture before it achieved statehood. Prior to colonization, Wabanaki nations farmed large crops of corn and other produce in southern Maine.

The state is a major producer of potatoes. Until World War II, Maine was the number one potato producer in the nation. In 2022, Maine ranked ninth in producing the most potatoes in the nation. That same year, Maine potato growers shipped 21 million potatoes (equal to more than 530 truckloads) to processors in Washington state and as seed potatoes for Idaho farmers, after northwestern potato crops suffered from the hot, dry 2021 season.

Maine is the number one U.S. producer of low-bush blueberries (Vaccinium angustifolium). Preliminary data from the USDA for 2012 also indicate Maine was the largest blueberry producer of the major blueberry producing states, with 91,100,000 lbs. This data includes both low (wild), and high-bush (cultivated) blueberries: Vaccinium corymbosum.

In 2020, medicinal cannabis became the state's most valuable agricultural crop with a sales value of $266 million, surpassing the value of blueberries and potatoes according to Maine Revenue Services. Recreational cannabis sales totaled $158.9 million in 2022.

Maine was a center of grain production in the 1800s, until grain production moved westward. However, in the early 2000s the local food movement spurred renewed interested in locally grown grains. In 2007, the Kneading Conference was founded. In, 2012, the Skowhegan grist mill Maine Grains opened. The revival of grain farming and milling in Maine has led to the creation of other businesses, including bakeries and malthouses. In 2020, the first Maine farmers grew hemp for its grain crop.

Dairy products and chicken's eggs are other major industries. Maine has a smaller number of commodity farms and confined animal feeding operations. Apples, maple syrup and sweet corn are other major agricultural crops.

Maine has many vegetable farms and other small, diversified farms. In the 1960s and 1970s, the book "Living the Good Life" by Helen Nearing and Scott Nearing caused many young people to move to Maine and engage in small-scale farming and homesteading. These back-to-the-land migrants increased the population of some counties.

Maine is home to the Maine Organic Farmers and Gardeners Association and had 535 certified organic farms in 2019.

Food

Since the 1980s, the state has gotten a reputation for its local food and restaurant meals. Portland was named Bon Appetit magazine's Restaurant City of the Year in 2018. Biddeford was selected by Food & Wine in 2022 as one of America's next great food cities. In 2018, HealthIQ.com named Maine the 3rd most vegan state. Maine food shares many ingredients with Wabanaki cuisine, including corn, beans, squash, wild blueberries, maple syrup, fish, and seafood. Baked beans are a common dish in Maine, served at community suppers where the beans are sometimes cooked underground in a bean hole. In New England, Maine baked beans are one of two well-known regional styles of baked beans, the other being Boston baked beans. Both styles use similar seasonings (molasses, mustard, onions). The difference is that Maine baked beans use thicker skinned, native bean varieties such like Marafax, soldier, and yellow-eye beans, and Boston baked beans use thinner skinned, small, white beans such as navy beans.

Sports teams

Professional
 Maine Celtics, basketball, NBA G League
 Portland Sea Dogs, minor league baseball, Double-A Northeast
 Maine Mariners, ice hockey, ECHL

Non-professional

 Portland Phoenix FC, soccer, Premier Developmental League
 Maine Roller Derby, roller derby, Women's Flat Track Derby Association

NCAA

 Maine Black Bears

State symbols

Adapted from the Maine facts site.
 State berry: Wild blueberry
 State bird: Black-capped chickadee
 State cat: Maine Coon
 State dessert: Blueberry pie made with wild Maine blueberries
 State fish: Land-locked salmon
 State flower: White Pinecone and Tassel
 State fossil: Pertica quadrifaria
 State gemstone: Tourmaline
 State herb: Wintergreen
 State insect: European honey bee
 State mammal: Moose
 State Crustacean: Lobster
 State soft drink: Moxie
 State soil: Chesuncook soil series
 State song: "State of Maine Song"
 State treat: Whoopie pie
 State tree: Eastern White Pine
 State vessel: Arctic exploration schooner Bowdoin
 State motto: Dirigo ("I lead")

Terminology 
Maine vernacular and terminology is unique in comparison to the rest of the country. There are unique terms like "from away", "Upta camp" and "Ayuh" that are popular in the state.

People from Maine

Citizens of Maine are often known as "Mainer"s, though the term is often reserved for those whose roots in Maine go back at least three generations. The term "Downeaster" may be applied to residents of the northeast coast of the state. The term "Mainiac" is considered by some to be derogatory, but is embraced with pride by others, and is used for a variety of organizations and for events such as the YMCA Mainiac Sprint Triathlon & Duathlon.

See also
 Index of Maine-related articles
 Outline of Maine

References

Notes

Citations

External links

State government
 Maine government
 Maine Office of Tourism Search for tourism-related businesses
 Visit Maine (agriculture) Maine fairs, festivals, etc.—Agricultural Dept.

U.S. government
 Maine State Guide, from the Library of Congress
 U.S. EIA Energy Profile for Maine—economic, environmental and energy data
 U.S. Geological Survey Real-time, geographic, and other scientific resources of Maine
 U.S. Dept. of Agriculture Maine State Facts—agricultural
 U.S. Census Bureau Quick facts on Maine
 Portland Magazine Editorial on Maine news, events, and people

Information
 
 Maine Historical Society
 Old USGS maps of Maine.
 1860 Map of Maine by Mitchell.
 1876 Panoramic Birdseye View of Portland by Warner at LOC.,
 

 
States of the United States
New England states
Northeastern United States
States and territories established in 1820
States of the East Coast of the United States
1820 establishments in the United States
Contiguous United States